Angélica María Hartman Ortiz (born September 27, 1944), known professionally as La novia de Mexico (Mexico's sweetheart), is an American-Mexican actress and singer-songwriter. Her songs El hombre de mi vida (The man of my life) peaked at No. 6, Reina Y Cenicienta (Queen and Cinderella) peaked at No. 9, Prohibido (Prohibited) peaked at No. 13, and El Taconazo (The Taconazo) peaked at No. 34 on the hot Latin songs chart. She also belongs to the so-called Golden Age of Mexican cinema.

Early life
Born in 1944 in New Orleans, Louisiana, Angélica María is the daughter of American entrepreneur, Arnold Hartman, and theater producer, Angélica de Jesús Ortiz Sandoval. Following the divorce of her parents at the age of 5, María moved to Mexico City with her mother.

Early career
Her mother's sister, Yolanda Ortiz, introduced little Angélica to the Mexican Cinema when Gregorio Wallerstein, a movie producer, was looking for a boy for his next movie. Angélica told the producer, "Give me a haircut and I'm that boy". Charmed by the girl, he let her into his audition. She got the role in the movie Pecado ("Sin"). Soon afterwards, she worked on, Una Mujer Decente ("A Decent Woman"), La Hija de la Otra ("The Daughter of the Mistress"), Los Amantes ("The Lovers"), Fierecilla (Little Beast), Sígueme, Corazón ("Follow Me, Sweetheart"). She obtained the Ariel award for her role in Mi Esposa y la Otra ("My Wife and the Mistress") when she was 6. She also performed in her first fotonovela Rayito del Sol ("Little Sunray"). She sang in her two next movies, 2 Caras Tiene el Destino ("Destiny Has Two Faces") and Los Gavilanes (The Hawks) with superstar Pedro Infante, who told her she would be a great actress, because she spoke with her eyes, as he did.

Teen idol
In 1955, Rita Macedo offered her a role in the play La mala semilla (The Bad Seed), which would be the first of a series of plays she was involved with while she filmed. When she was 16 she joined the telenovela industry with the production Cartas de amor (Love Letters). The following year, she acted in musicals as well as in "lucha libre" movies such as El Señor Tormenta (Lord Storm) and Muerte en el ring (Death in the Ring). At that time she was beginning to be referred to as La novia de la juventud (Youth's girlfriend) and after her first musical, a journalist, Octavio de Alba, named her La Novia de México (Mexico's girlfriend or Mexico's sweetheart), which is the title she would keep thereafter.

Singing career
After a few musicals, she asked for her mother's assistance (who was also her manager) and together with Armando Manzanero, then a new songwriter, she sang 1962's Eddy Eddy which would eventually become one of her greatest musical successes. Manzanero took Angélica to see a producer, and in the same year she released her first album on the Musart record label. The album was a success, so she began touring and making movies with teen idols such as César Costa and actor/singer Enrique Guzmán whom she would date later. After joining RCA, she would later become one of the biggest stars in Latin America. In 1973 she met the aspiring singer Juan Gabriel who would become one of the biggest selling artists in the world. Together, they would record ballads performed by mariachi bands. The single Tú sigues siendo el mismo ("You are still the same one") sold one million copies in the United States alone, and has since then been performed by dozens of other singers. She recorded three more albums in 1974. In 1980, she recorded for the first time in a U. K. studio, making an album of ballads and a single record with two pop songs in English, seeking some kind of crossover. During these years, she signed with Marsal Productions, then Caytronics, Melody, RCA again, and finally CBS, which was her last contract with a foreign record company. Since then, she established her own recording company with which she has produced 7 albums.

Her singing career spans through 2013, being her most recent album "With Your Love", produced by R. Levaron, and launched by Universal Music.

Acting career
In 1965, she filmed "Fray Torero" (Friar Bullfighter) in Spain and came back to Mexico to work in two movies, and to record her sixth album. Then, she acted in such successful films as 5 de chocolate y 1 de fresa (Five of chocolate and one of strawberry) and obtained the starring role in the 1968 film version of Corazón salvaje a movie that made her famous in places as far as China. In 1971, she acted in Ernesto Alonso's telenovela Muchacha italiana viene a casarse ("Italian girl comes to get married") which opened the Spanish television market in the United States, and was a success in Central America and South America. She also filmed one of her biggest telenovelas Ana del aire ("Ana of the air", playing a flight attendant role). In 1977, she made the telenovela version of her film Corazón salvaje, released two albums, and performed in the play Papacito Piernas Largas ("Daddy Long-legs"), a play that would spun off an album, and broke the record of more than 1000 performances sold out in the next 3 years.

In 1986, she starred in Herencia Maldita ("Cursed inheritance") singing the theme-song and releasing an album called "El Hombre de Mi Vida". She later acted with her daughter in a production by Angélica Ortíz titled Una Estrella. In 1988 she divorced Vale and starred in a TV show titled Tres generaciones ("Three generations") with Carmen Montejo and Sasha Sokol. In 1990 she acted in the play Mamá ama el rock ("Mom loves rock") with her daughter and Ricky Martin. 
In 1994, she acted in Luis de Llano's Agujetas de color de rosa which would be such a great success that it was extended to 600 episodes. 
In 1995 she acted in telenovela La Antorcha Encendida, sharing credits with Leticia Calderon, Juan Ferrara, Ofelia Guilmáin etc. and in 1996 she was offered a leading role in telenovela Bendita Mentira.
In 1999 she made a special guest appearance as a mother of Thalia in telenovela Rosalinda, promoting her new album of boleros. The same year Angélica impressed the audience in the theater play La mama nos quita los novios, sharing credits with Julio Alemán.

In 2003 she joined the cast of Sea of dreams sharing credits with Sonia Braga.
In 2004 she took part in Amar otra vez, produced by Lucero Suárez, which began broadcasting in January in the U.S. and in México in May 2004.

In 2011 participated in the Telemundo telenovela Aurora, co-starred in Mi corazon insiste and had a special guest appearance in the telenovela La Casa de al Lado, (2011 to 2012).

From August 2012 to May 2013, Angelica Maria acted as 'Amalia Mendoza' in Qué Bonito Amor, starring along Danna García, Jorge Salinas, Juan Ferrara,  Evita Muñoz "Chachita", etc.

Personal life
In 1974, she met Venezuelan singer/comedian Raúl Vale, whom she married in April 1975 in the first wedding to be televised in Mexico. That year she broke records in New York City when her show was sold out twice in the same day at the Madison Square Garden. This record has not yet been broken. In November 1975 her daughter, the international actress, comedian, singer, and impersonator Angélica Vale, was born.

In 2003 Angélica María, negotiating with a major publishing house, launched an autobiography which would release the lesser known aspects of her life as an actress and a woman. It was published by Reader's Digest in November 2005.

She is fluent in Spanish, English, and French.

International tours
In 1980, she recorded her 28th album and created the show La historia del cine ("The history of cinema") in which she sang, danced, and performed various characters. She changed wardrobes 15 times without leaving the stage. That same year she recorded another album with Juan Gabriel and starred in El hogar que yo robé ("The home I stole") that would be remade in the 1990s as La usurpadora. Next year she took her show in a tour throughout the Americas. In 1982, she recorded another "balada ranchera" album and obtained a role in her first English-language film Matar a un extraño ("To kill a stranger") and presented a second show La magia de Angélica María ("The magic of Angélica María") in places from New York to Chile.

In 2001, Reader's Digest released an album of her hits, and she acted in the short Qué me va a hacer.

In 2006, joined again the show "Los Grandes del Rock" making tours throughout Mexico, and reteamed with her daughter Angelica Vale for the telenovela La fea mas bella (The Prettiest Ugly Girl). The series was a ratings smash, and in 2009 they acted again as a mother and daughter in the second season of Mujeres asesinas (Murderous women) in the episode Julia, encubridora.  
The latter series marked Angelica Maria's second, and to date permanent, departure from Televisa, after a total of 43 years (1962–81 and 1986–2009).

In 2009, she was participating with Armando Manzanero in the show "The Women of Manzanero", touring throughout all Mexico, alongside singers such as: Tania Libertad, Ariadne, María del Sol, Rocio Banquells, Manoella Torres, Edith Márquez, Myriam, among others.

Other work
In 2012 Angelica joined Alberto Vázquez and César Costa in the show TR3S, performing tours throughout Mexico, delighting their Mexican & Latin audiences with their singing voices, up until nowadays. Enrique Guzman would join The Troupe, later on.

Between June 2013 and 2014, Angelica formed part of the jury of the Spanish-language version of The X Factor, which was broadcast starting that summer on MundoFox in the United States.

In 2013, Angélica launched her most recent compilation: 'With Your Love', available at: '"Liquid Spins"', as well as participating during the 50th Anniversary Celebration of Disney's: It's A Small World After All.

In 2014, she joined the ensemble cast of the film: 'Ruta Madre'.

She will be a regular cast member of the TV Series: Graves (TV series), (2016).

Music
 1962: Angélica María
 1962: Angélica María Vol.2
 1963: Angélica María Vol.3
 1964: Angélica María Vol.4
 1965: Angélica María Vol.5
 1965: Perdoname Mi Vida Angélica María y Alberto Vázquez (Soundtrack) (EP)
 1966: "Cantos De Navidad" (single)
 1966: La Novia De La Junventud Angélica María con Los Rebeldes del Rock
 1966: Angélica María Vol.6
 1967: Angélica María Vol.8
 1967: Me Quiero Casar Angélica María y Alberto Vázquez (Soundtrack) (EP)
 1968: Cuando me enamoro
 1968: Angélica Y Armando Angélica María y Armando Manzanero
 1968: Cinco De Chocolate Y Uno De Fresa (Soundtrack) (EP)
 1969: Somos Novios (Corazón Contento) Angélica María, Palito Ortega y Armando Manzanero (Soundtrack) (EP)
 1969: La Paloma
 1970: El Primer Amor
 1971: Angélica María 1971
 1972: El Primer Nobel Amor Angélica María y Roberto Jordán (Soundtrack) (EP)
 1972: Angélica María 1972 1973: Tonto
 1973: "Por Nosotros" Angélica María y Roberto Jordán (single)
 1974: Voy A Escribirte Una Carta
 1974: Yo Amo, Tu Amas, Nosotros... (EP)
 1974: Gigi Theatre (single)
 1974: Ana Del Aire (EP)
 1974: ¿Donde Estas Vidita Mia?
 1975: Una Muchach Igual Que Todas
 1976: Tranpas Para Un Amor Angélica María y Raúl Vale (Soundtrack) (EP)
 1976: Angélica María Con El Mariachi Mexico
 1976: Ha Nacido Mi Niña (EP)
 1976: Angélica María Con Mariachi
 1977: "Papacito Piernas Largas" Theatre (single)
 1977: Angélica María 1977
 1979: Cuanto Habla El Corazon
 1979: Angélica María y Raúl Vale
 1980: Loving in the Moonlight
 1980: Confia en Mi
 1981: Y la sentir de Juan Gabriel
 1983: La magia de Angélica María
 1983: Sera lo que sera
 1984: Cantar es siempre amor
 1985: Revelaciones
 1986: El Hombre de Mi Vida
 1988: Una Estrella
 1989: Pero Amanecio
 1990: Reina y Cenicienta
 1990: Mom loves Rock
 1992: Revolution
 1993: Las Grandes de Rock
 1994: Gracias
 1996: La viuda Alegre
 1998: Island with babies
 1999: Mis Exitos
 2000: Sabor a Nada
 2002: Bring me the Phone
 2003: Bring me the phone... en espanol
 2004: Boleros Reloaded
 2006: Amor del Bueno
 2007: Estrella mia
 2008: Por Supuesto
 2009: Que Emane (single)
 2010: Ven A Mi Soledad (single)
 2013: Con Tu Amor
 2013: With Your Love (single)

Filmography
TV shows
 1964: Premier Orfeon
 TV Musical (several seasons)
 Los Días Felices (several seasons)
 1975: Los Grandes Años del Rock And Roll
 Exitos Bacardí (several seasons)
 1977: Arriba El Telón
 Siempre En Domingo (yearly seasons)
 1984–1985: Angélica María En..... 
 1986: La Hora Marcada
 1989: Tres generaciones
 2008–2010: Angélica María Show
 2013–2014: El Factor X
 2016: Graves

 Telenovelas 

Hollywood films
 1982: To Kill a Stranger as Christina Carver
 2003: 'Sea of Dreams as Rina

Mexican films
 1950: Pecado as Miguelito (estreno 1951)
 1950: Una mujer decente as Hijito de Rosa (estreno 1950)
 1950: La hija de la otra as Lupita pequeña (estreno 1951)
 1950: Los amantes as Gloria (estreno 1951)
 1950: Fierecilla as Rosita niña (estreno 1951)
 1951: Sígueme corazón as María Luisa (estreno 1952)
 1951: Mi esposa y la otra as Carmelita (estreno 1952)
 1951: Dos caras tiene el destino as Rosa María (estreno 1952)
 1951: La ausente as Rosita (1952)
 1952: Secretaria particular as Venus (1952)
 1952: La Cobarde as Rosa María (1953)
 1952: Sucedió en Acapulco as Niña empleada por chantajistas (1953)
 1954: Los gavilanes as Florecita (1956)
 1955: Sublime melodía as Clarita (1956)
 1956: El buen ladrón as Angélica (1957)
 1956: Música de siempre as Bailarina (estreno 1958)
 1957: Mexican Manhunt/Flores para mi general as Rosa María
 1959: Aventuras de la pandilla as La Cachuquis
 1959: La pandilla en acción
 1959: La pandilla se divierte
 1959: Triunfa la pandilla
 1961: Las hijas del Amapolo (1962)
 1961: Muchachas que trabajan as Tere (1961)
 1962: Bajo el manto de la noche as Margot (1962)
 1962: El Señor Tormenta as Rosita (1963)
 1962: Tormenta en el ring as Rosita (1963)
 1962: El cielo y la tierra as Marisa (1963)
 1962: Mi vida es una canción as Marta (1963)
 1962: Los signos del zodiaco as Sofía (1964)
 1963: Adorada Enemiga (1965)
 1963: Vivir de sueños as María (1964)
 1963: Mi alma por un amor as Marga (1964)
 1963: La sombra de los hijos as Nora (1964)
 1963: Napoleoncito as Rosita (1964)
 1964: El gángster' (1965)
 1964: Mi héroe as Mané (1965)
 1964: Perdóname mi vida as Dina (1965)
 1965: Fray Torero (Spain, 1966)
 1966: Sólo para tí as Elena Montero (1966)
 1966: Me quiero casar (1967)
 1967: 5 de chocolate y 1 de fresa as Esperanza/Brenda/Domitila (estreno 1969)
 1967: Corazón salvaje (1968)
 1968: Romeo contra Julieta (1968)
 1968: Como perros y gatos (1969)
 1968: El cuerpazo del delito (1969)
 1968: Somos novios (1969)
 1969: Alguien nos quiere matar as Carlota (1970)
 1970: Ya se quién eres (te he estado observando) as Rosalba (1971)
 1971: La verdadera vocación de Magdalena as Magdalena, "Magui"/"Irene Durán" (1972)
 1972: Entre monjas anda El Diablo as María (1973)
 1972: ¡Quiero vivir mi vida! as Lucía (1973)
 1972: El Premio Nobel del amor as Leonarda Tomasa Isaaca (1973)
 1974: Yo amo, tu amas, nosotros... (1975)
 1977: Penthouse de la muerte (1978)
 1978: La guerra de los pasteles (1979)
 2002: ¿Qué me va a hacer? (cortometraje)
 2007: Huevos revueltos (mediometraje) (2009)
 2010: Anos Despues
 2010: Salsa Tel Aviv
 2019: Como caído del cielo as her self

Theatre
 1955: La mala semilla
 1960: El canto de la cigara
 1961: Las fascinadoras
 1965: Sí quiero
 1966: Cuando oscurezca
 1968: Marat/Sade as Charlotte Corday
 1974–1975: Gigi as Colette
 1976: Te encontre en abril
 1976: Trampas de amor
 1977–1979: Papacito piernas largas Daddy Long Legs
 1987–1988: Una estrella
 1990–1991: Mamá ama el rock
 1993: La viuda alegre
 1995: La isla de los ninos
 1996: La mujer del ano Woman of the Year as Tess Harding
 1999: Mama nos quita los novios
 2007: Emociones encontradas by Richard Baer ... as Cristina
 2014: Los monologos de la vagina The Vagina Monologues at the Westside theatre, NYC

Facts
 Angélica María is known as La Novia de México (Girlfriend of Mexico).
 Although she was one of the main movie and TV attractions during 60s and 70s and the no. 1 record seller in the country during the same period, she is still one of the most respected and beloved performers in Mexico.
 For her work on stage, screen, television and as a singer, Angélica María has been inducted into the Paseo de las Luminarias at Mexico City's Plaza de las Estrellas; she and Angélica Vale are among the few mother and daughter entertainers to be honored as such.
 Angélica Maria, Raul Vale and Angélica Vale were included in the 2007 book Televisa Presenta, paying tribute to the first 50 years of the network.

Awards and nominations

Premios TVyNovelas

Premios Diosas de Plata

Premios ATP (Asociación de Periodistas Teatrales)

Premios Excelencia Musical (Academia Latina de la Grabación)

Premios People en Español

References

External links
 
 Angélica María at the Telenovela Database
 Angélica María's Publicist's Official Mini-Site
 Angelica Maria: Official site in Spanish
 Angélica María's music at Liquid Spins

1944 births
Living people
Chespirito actors
Mexican child actresses
Mexican people of American descent
Mexican telenovela actresses
Mexican television actresses
Mexican film actresses
Mexican stage actresses
Mexican women singer-songwriters
Mexican singer-songwriters
20th-century Mexican actresses
21st-century Mexican actresses
Actresses from Mexico City
Actresses from New Orleans
Singers from Mexico City
American people of Mexican descent
American people of German descent
Mexican people of German descent
American emigrants to Mexico
People from Mexico City
Latin Grammy Lifetime Achievement Award winners
Women in Latin music